Walthard cell rests, sometimes called Walthard cell nests, are a benign cluster of epithelial cells most commonly found in the connective tissue of the Fallopian tubes, but also seen in the mesovarium, mesosalpinx and ovarian hilus.

Appearance

They appear as white/yellow cysts or nodules that can reach a size of 2 millimeters.  They typically have elliptical nuclei with a long groove (along the major axis) – so-called "coffee bean" nuclei.

Pathology
It has been suggested that these cell rests are the histogenetic origins of Brenner tumors, due to the histological similarity of the epithelium of Walthard cell rests and Brenner tumors to the urothelium of the lower urinary tract. Also, it has been proposed that Brenner tumors and Walthard cell rests signify urothelial differentiation within the female genital tract.

Eponym
They are named after Swiss gynecologist Max Walthard (1867–1933), who provided a comprehensive description of them in 1903.

Additional images

References 
 Pathology Outline, Fallopian Tubes
 
 Wrong Diagnosis.com, Brenner tumors

Histology
Gynaecology